The Sail Tower (Beit HaMifras), officially District Government Center - Building B is a skyscraper and government building in Haifa, Israel. It is part of Haifa's District Government Center (responsible for the Haifa District), named after Yitzhak Rabin.

Its construction began in 1999 and was completed on February 28, 2002. It has 29 floors and stands at 137 m (405 ft). As such, it was the tallest skyscraper in Haifa until 2003, surpassed by the IEC Tower. Counting antennas, it is still the tallest building in Haifa. Without the antennas, the sails of the Sail Tower reach 113 m, and its main roof is at 95 m.

The District Government Center in Haifa was planned to combine new and old elements. In contrast with the modern Sail Tower, the promenade leading up to it was designed in an older Middle Eastern style, including mosaic on the floors depicting the history of Haifa. One of the maps depicted dates back to 1773.

Inclusion in media 
In Social Quantum's mobile app, Megapolis, a building called "Zodiac building" appears. The in game building is designed after the Sail building in Haifa.

See also
List of skyscrapers in Israel
 Vasco da Gama Tower, skyscraper of similar appearance in Lisbon, Portugal (sail)
 Trump Ocean Club Hotel and Tower, skyscraper of similar appearance in Panama City, Panama (sail)
 W Barcelona, skyscraper of similar appearance in Barcelona, Spain (sail)
 Spinnaker Tower, skyscraper of similar appearance in Portsmouth, United Kingdom (sail)
 Burj Al Arab, skyscraper of similar appearance in Dubai, United Arab Emirates (sail)
 Elite Plaza Business Center, skyscraper of similar appearance in Yerevan, Armenia (sail)

References

External links

Information at Emporis

Buildings and structures in Haifa
Skyscraper office buildings in Israel
Government buildings completed in 2002
Postmodern architecture
2002 establishments in Israel